Damisha Croney (born 3 November 1991) is a Barbadian netball player who represents Barbados internationally and plays in the positions of wing attack and centre. She competed at the Netball World Cup on two occasions in 2011 and 2019. She also represented Barbados at the Commonwealth Games in 2010, 2014 and in 2018.

References 

1991 births
Living people
Barbadian netball players
Netball players at the 2010 Commonwealth Games
Netball players at the 2014 Commonwealth Games
Netball players at the 2018 Commonwealth Games
Commonwealth Games competitors for Barbados
2019 Netball World Cup players
Sportspeople from Bridgetown